General Pio del Pilar National High School is a public high school in Osias St., Poblacion, Makati.

External links
https://web.archive.org/web/20140226231022/http://genpiodelpilarnhs.edu.ph/

Educational institutions established in 1947
High schools in Metro Manila
1947 establishments in the Philippines
Schools in Makati